= Earl Merkman =

Earl N. Merkman (April 27, 1962 - November 18, 1988) was the youngest commissioner in the Netherlands Antilles (26 years).

Earl was the eldest son of Ruford Merkman and Claristine Eunicy Merkman-Liburd, born on Sint Eustatius.

Earl Merkman had 6 brothers and 3 sisters. His brothers are Reuben Merkman, Maurits Merkman, Calvin Merkman, Selvyn Merkman, Oswin Merkman and Rignaldo Merkman. His sisters are Edris Merkman, Beulah Merkman and Javanca Merkman.
